Oando Plc is a Nigerian multinational energy company operating in the upstream, midstream and downstream.

In July 2016, Oando entered into a tri-partite agreement with the Vitol Group, an independent trader of energy commodities and Helios Investment Partner, an Africa-focused private investment firm to form OVH (formerly known as Oando Downstream).

In September 2016, Oando announced the execution of a definitive agreement with a vehicle owned by funds advised by Helios Investment Partners LLP ("Helios"), a premier Africa-focused private investment firm, to acquire 49% of the voting rights in Oando's midstream business subsidiary, Oando Gas and Power Limited.

History
Oando's earliest roots can be traced to the formation of Esso Africa in 1956. Esso Africa was a downstream marketing company, a subsidiary of the Exxon Corporation of USA. To increase availability of petroleum products in the hinterland, in 1976 the Nigerian government purchased a controlling stake in the company and rebranded the company as Unipetrol Nigeria. On 1 March 1991, Unipetrol became a Public Limited company. Later on in the same year, the Nigerian government sold 60% equity to the Nigerian public in an initial public offering. By February 1992, Unipetrol was listed on the Nigerian Stock Exchange.

In 1999, Unipetrol acquired a 40% stake in Gaslink Nigeria Limited, a gas utility company. The acquisition was motivated by a desire to utilize its exclusive gas sale and purchase agreement with the Nigerian gas company. In 2001, the company increased its stake to 51 per cent. So far, Gaslink has developed 250 km of gas pipeline infrastructure.

In 2000, Ocean and Oil, a private investment company led by Nigerian entrepreneurs Adewale Tinubu and Omamofe Boyo acquired a 30% controlling interest in Unipetrol Plc. In 2001, Ocean and Oil increased its stake in Unipetrol to 42% via an irredeemable convertible loan stock issue.

In 2002, Ocean and Oil led Unipetrol's bid for a 60% stake of Agip Nigeria Plc, a rival petroleum marketing firm, owned by Agip Petroli BV, an Italian-based oil company. The merged company was named Oando PLC in 2003, making the company the largest downstream petroleum marketing company in Nigeria.

In 2005, Oando Energy Services was incorporated as an integrated Oilfield Services company to achieve the group's objectives in the upstream services industry.

In 2007, Oando Energy services acquired two oil drilling rigs in Nigeria's Niger Delta. In 2008, the company emerged Nigeria's first indigenous oil company with interests in producing deep water assets through the acquisition of equity in two oil blocks. By 2009, the company had acquired 5 swamp rigs and in 2010, the company launched its first Independent Power Plant for the Lagos Water Corporation. The project involved the construction of a 12.5MW power plant to provide uninterrupted power supply to the Lagos Water Corporation.

In 2011, Oando Gas and Power commissioned 128 km EHGC Pipeline, the pipeline was built under a joint venture arrangement with the Nigerian Gas Company (NGC), a subsidiary of the Nigerian National Petroleum Corporation (NNPC).

In 2012, Oando Exploration and Production Limited ("OEPL") signed a farm-in agreement with Network Exploration & Production Nigeria Limited ("NEPN") for the acquisition of 40% participating interest in the Qua Iboe field (OML 13) subject to the consent of the Minister of Petroleum.

In 2013, Oando Plc succeeded in raising over N55.2 billion from the capital markets as its Rights Issue recorded 101 per cent subscription. The company issued 4.548 billion shares to existing shareholders at N12 per share between December 2012 and February 2013 with the intention of raising N54.6 billion.
Oando Gas and Power commissioned 10.4 MW Alausa Independent Power Plant to provide electricity to the Lagos State Secretariat Complex.
Following the decommissioning of OES Professionalism in 2013, OES currently has a fleet of 4 rigs; OES Teamwork, OES Respect, OES Integrity and OES Passion.

In 2014, Oando divested the 128 km Eastern Horizon Gas Company (EHGC) franchise in a $250 Million transaction with Seven Energy.

In 2014, Oando Energy Resources ("OER") listed on the TSX an affiliate company of Oando PLC entered into agreements with ConocoPhillips ("COP") to acquire its entire business interests in Nigeria for a total cash consideration of ~ $1.5 Billion.

In June 2015, Oando entered into an agreement with HV Investments II B.V., ("HVI"), a joint venture owned by a fund advised by Helios Investment Partners ("Helios") and The Vitol Group ("Vitol"), for a cash investment of US$461 million in Oando's Downstream business.

In 2016, Oando PLC completes a strategic US$115.8 million gas and power agreement with Helios. Oando PLC completes sale of Akute IPP.

In April 2018, the Securities and Exchange Commission (Nigeria) gave the directive for Oando PLC's shares to resume trading on the Nigerian Stock Exchange after placing the company's shares on suspension in October 2017 in order to execute a forensic audit.

On 31 May 2019, the Securities and Exchange Commission (Nigeria) issued a "Press Release on Investigation of Oando Plc" notifying the public of the conclusion of the commission's investigations of allegations against Oando. The Commission ordered the resignation of board members implicated and barred "...the Group Chief Executive Officer (GCEO) and the Deputy Group Chief Executive Officer (DGCEO) of Oando Plc from being directors of public companies for a period of five (5) years".

On Monday 3 June 2019 the Federal High Court of Lagos under presiding Judge C M A Olatoregun granted Oando PLC's Group Chief Executive, Adewale Tinubu, and Deputy Group Chief Executive, Omamofe Boyo, an injunction restraining the Securities and Exchange Commission from executing sanctions, pending the hearing and determination of the applicant's motion for interlocutory injunction.

On 4 September 2020 Oando announced that the NNPC/NAOC/OANDO Joint Venture made Significant Gas & Condensates Discovery Onshore Niger Delta find in the deeper sequences of the Obiafu-Obrikom fields, in OML61, onshore Niger Delta.

On 13 December 2020 Oando announced the successful signing of two gas supply agreements with Nigeria Liquefied Natural Gas Ltd (NLNG) for the renewal of gas supply for the existing Trains 1-3 for a term of 10 years and for gas supply for the impending Train 7 for a term of 20 years.

On 19 July 2021, Oando entered into a settlement with the Securities and Exchange Commission. The settlement reached by the parties was aimed at preventing further market disruption and harm to Oando PLC’s shareholders. As a result, Oando’s directors and management team have the opportunity to fully focus on business operations whilst continuing to ensure that it is in compliance with all governing statutes.

Statistics 
Exploration and Production:

Assets Portfolio:
14 Producing

Development & Exploration Assets:
  of oil equivalent of 2P Reserves 
  of oil equivalent of 2C Resources

Trading:
C 7% of Nigeria's Fuel Requirement is Supplied by Oando Trading

OVH Energy:
> 320 Retail Outlets Operations in Nigeria, Ghana, Benin and Togo

Operating divisions 
Oando PLC is organized functionally into a number of operating divisions. These divisions are grouped into three categories:
Upstream: Oando Energy Resources (OER, The leading indigenous exploration and production company in Nigeria)
Downstream: Oando Vitol and Helios (OVH Energy), Oando Trading

References

External links 

 

Oil and gas companies of Nigeria
Multinational companies based in Lagos
Companies listed on the Johannesburg Stock Exchange
Non-renewable resource companies established in 1956
Companies listed on the Nigerian Stock Exchange